Iron City, also spelled Ironcity, is an unincorporated community in Calhoun County, Alabama, United States.

History
Iron City was named after the iron ore found in the area. It was located on the Southern Railway route between Muscadine and Birmingham. A post office called Ironcity was established in 1889, and remained in operation until it was discontinued in 1935.

Notable people
William B. Bowling, U.S. Representative from 1920 to 1928
Lloyd Greer, architect

References

Unincorporated communities in Calhoun County, Alabama
Unincorporated communities in Alabama